Catherine M. Sama is a professor of Italian at the University of Rhode Island. Her research focuses on Early Modern and 18th-Century Italian Women Writers, Correspondence Networks, The Italian Enlightenment, Italian Women Artists, and Gender Studies. In 2013 she was a recipient of the National Endowment for the Humanities Research Fellowship. She also serves as a board member of the URI Center for the Humanities. She has edited the work and written a biography of the 18th-century Italian writer Elisabetta Caminèr Turra.

Education
Sama earned her BA from the University of Virginia in 1985, where she majored in French and minored in Italian. She earned her PhD from Brown University in 1995. She also serves as a board member of the URI Center for the Humanities.

Selected publications
Italy's Eighteenth Century: Gender and Culture in the Age of the Grand Tour. 
Elisabetta Caminer Turra, Selected Writings of an Eighteenth-Century Venetian Woman of Letters. 
"On Canvas and on the Page: Women Shaping Culture in Eighteenth-Century Venice", in Italy's Eighteenth Century: Gender and Culture in the Age of the Grand Tour, edited by Paula Findlen, Wendy Roworth, and Catherine M. Sama  (Stanford: Stanford University Press, 2009), 125-150; 383-393.
"Luisa Bergalli e le sorelle Carriera: un rapporto d'amicizia e di collaborazione professionale", in Luisa Bergalli poetessa drammaturga traduttrice critica letteraria, edited by Adriana Chemello (Mirano-Venice: Eidos, 2008), 59-75.
"Liberty, Equality, Frivolity!  An Italian Critique of Fashion Periodicals". Eighteenth-Century Studies vol. 37, no. 3 (2004): 389-414.
"Becoming Visible: a Biography of Elisabetta Caminer Turra (1751-96) During Her Formative Years". Studi veneziani N.S. LXIII  (2002): 349-388.

Selected honors and awards
2006-2007: URI Center for the Humanities Sabbatical Fellowship
2008: URI Center for the Humanities Visiting Scholar Grant, for the visit of Professor Antonia Arslan.
2008: URI Center for the Humanities Faculty Research Grant
2013: *URI Center for the Humanities Sabbatical Fellowship
2013: National Endowment for the Humanities Research Fellowship
 2017:URI Teaching Excellence Award

Further reading
 Jones, Verina R. "Work: Selected Writings of an Eighteenth-Century Venetian Woman of Letters by Elisabetta Caminer Turra, Catherine M. Sama". The Modern Language Review Vol. 103, No. 1 (Jan., 2008), pp. 254–255 Publisher: Modern Humanities Research Association
 Storrs, Christopher. "Reviewed Work: Italy's Eighteenth Century: Gender and Culture in the Age of the Grand Tour by Paula Findlen; Wendy Wassyng Roworth; Catherine M. Sama." The English Historical Review, Vol. 125, No. 512 (FEBRUARY 2010), pp. 194–196. Publisher: Oxford University Press.
 Carole, Paul. "Reviewed works: Naples and Vesuvius on the Grand Tour; Rome on the Grand Tour; Drawing Italy in the Age of the Grand Tour". Eighteenth-Century Studies Vol. 36, No. 1, Contested Exhibitions (Fall, 2002), pp. 86–92. Publisher: The Johns Hopkins University Press.

References

University of Rhode Island faculty
Living people
Brown University alumni
University of Virginia alumni
20th-century American women writers
21st-century American writers
21st-century American women writers
Gender studies academics
American people of Italian descent
Year of birth missing (living people)